Neopibanga brescoviti is a species of beetle in the family Cerambycidae, and the only species in the genus Neopibanga. It was described by Martins and Galileo in 1998.

References

Eupromerini
Beetles described in 1998